Elwyn Gwyther (8 March 1921 - 21 March 1996) was a Welsh rugby union and professional rugby league footballer who played in the 1940s and 1950s.

Background
Elwyn Gwyther's birth was registered in Gower Peninsula district, Wales.

Playing career

Club career
Gwyther played  in Belle Vue Rangers' 7–10 defeat by Wigan in the 1947 Lancashire Cup Final during the 1947–48 season at Wilderspool Stadium, Warrington on Saturday 1 November 1947.

Gwyther was signed by Leeds in October 1952. In September 1954, he returned to Belle Vue Rangers.

International honours
Elwyn Gwyther represented Wales XV (RU) while at Llanelli RFC in the 'Victory International' non-Test match(es) between December 1945 and April 1946, and won caps for Wales (RL) while at Belle Vue Rangers, and Leeds  1947–1953 15-caps, and won caps for Great Britain (RL) while at Belle Vue Rangers  in 1947 against New Zealand (2 matches), in 1950 against Australia (3 matches); and in 1951 against New Zealand.

Six rugby league footballers represented Wales XV (RU) while at rugby league clubs, they were; Tyssul Griffiths, Elwyn Gwyther, Gomer Hughes, Hugh Lloyd-Davies, Harold Thomas and Leslie Thomas.

Gomer Hughes, and Harold Thomas had previously won Wales (RU) caps, but the other footballers hadn't, and having already changed to the rugby league code they were unable to do so, but Tyssul Griffiths, Elwyn Gwyther, Leslie Thomas, did go on to win Wales (RL) caps.

References

External links
!Great Britain Statistics at englandrl.co.uk (statistics currently missing due to not having appeared for both Great Britain, and England)

(archived by web.archive.org) Britain hold out Kiwis at Odsal
Men of League - Robert L. Seddon
Welsh stars still had a rugby ball in wartime
Picture Elwyn Gwyther
Elwyn Gwyther

1921 births
1996 deaths
Broughton Rangers players
Footballers who switched code
Great Britain national rugby league team players
Leeds Rhinos players
Llanelli RFC players
People from Glamorgan
Rugby league players from Swansea
Rugby league props
Rugby union players from Swansea
Wales national rugby league team players
Welsh rugby league players
Welsh rugby union players